Werner Kopp (born 25 August 1902, date of death unknown) was a Swiss water polo player. He competed in the men's tournament at the 1936 Summer Olympics.

References

1902 births
Year of death missing
Swiss male water polo players
Olympic water polo players of Switzerland
Water polo players at the 1936 Summer Olympics
Place of birth missing